Taine Jackson Murray (born 19 April 2002) is a New Zealand college basketball player for the Virginia Cavaliers of the Atlantic Coast Conference (ACC).

Early life
Murray was born in Hong Kong to New Zealand parents, returning to New Zealand as a child. Murray attended Kristin School, where his mother taught, and Rosmini College.

Early career
Murray began playing for Rosmini College's basketball team in 2017. He helped the team to an 82–14 record across his tenure, including national championships in 2017 and 2018, and a second-place finish in 2019. He scored a career-high 49 points in a win over Auckland Grammar School.

Murray joined the Auckland Huskies prior to the 2020 New Zealand NBL season. In 10 games, he averaged 17.8 points, 3.5 rebounds and 1.7 assists per game.

In August 2020, Murray joined the New Zealand Breakers as a non-contracted development player for the 2020–21 NBL season. He appeared in just two games during the season, logging no box score statistics.

Recruiting
On 13 September 2020, following interest from multiple American college programs, Murray committed to the University of Virginia.

National team career
Murray was named to the New Zealand team competing in the 2019 FIBA Under-17 Oceania Championships, averaging 7 points, 1 rebound and 1.5 assists per game.

He was called up to the senior New Zealand national team for the first time for a 2021 FIBA Asia Cup qualifier against Australia on 20 February 2021. Murray led the inexperienced team in scoring with 14 points as they fell 52–81.

References

External links
Virginia Cavaliers bio

2002 births
Living people
New Zealand expatriate basketball people in the United States
New Zealand men's basketball players
Shooting guards
Virginia Cavaliers men's basketball players